TCG Oruçreis (F 245), is a   frigate of the Turkish Navy, the second ship of that class. She was named for Oruç Reis (c. 1474–1518), the Ottoman Beylerbeyi of the West Mediterranean. The submarine TCG Oruç Reis was the first ship of that name in the Turkish Navy.

Design and description
She has a displacement of 3,380 t at full load. She has CODOG machinery, with two controllable-pitch propellers powered by four GE LM2500 gas turbines, which generate , and two MTU 20V 1163 Diesel engines generating . She carries a helicopter of type S-70B Seahawk or Agusta-Bell AB-212 ASW. Personnel on duty are 21 officers, 92 petty officers, 11 specialized sergeants and 46 privates.

Ship sensors, radars and processing systems are Decca 2040 BT, AWS-9, HSA D08, HSA STIR −24, HSA STIR 18 and SQS-56. Electronic warfare and decoys installed on board are Racal Cutlass, Racal Scorpion and Mk 36 decoy. The frigate's armament include two MK 141 quad-cell launchers for eight RGM-84 Harpoond, one Mk 41 Mod 8 VLS for 16 RIM-162 ESSM Sea Sparrow PDMS (surface-to-air missile), one  5"/54 caliber Mark 45 gun, three Oerlikon-Contraves Sea Zenith 25mm CIWS gun systems and two Mark 32 Surface Vessel Torpedo Tubes.

Construction and career
The ship was built at Gölcük Naval Shipyard. She was launched on 28 July 1994 and commissioned on 23 May 1997.

As part of the "Barbaros Turkish Navy Task Group", she sailed along with the frigate , the corvette  and the support ship  to Lagos, Nigeria in April 2014. Members of the Turkish Task Group provided training to the Nigerian Navy and the Nigerian Coast Guard personnel on fighting against piracy, ship board safety and explosives.

References

External links

Barbaros-class frigates of the Turkish Navy
Ships built at Gölcük Naval Shipyard
1994 ships
Frigates of Turkey